Nico Blum (born 13 December 2000) is a former professional German darts player who has played in the Professional Darts Corporation events.

Career
Blum became the first person born in the year 2000 to win a PDC ranking match, when he defeated Josh Payne 6–4 in the first round of the 2017 German Darts Open, before eventually losing to Cristo Reyes in the second round.

He won the Boys title in the 2017 Winmau World Masters defeating Ireland's Keane Barry in a last-leg decider.

He was the runner-up in the 2019 German Darts Trophy when he defeated Michael Rosenauer 5–3 in the semi-final before losing to England's Colin Rice in a last-leg decider by 5–6.

Blum left the PDC in March 2020.

References

External links
Profile and stats on Darts Database

2000 births
Living people
German darts players
Sportspeople from Berlin
Professional Darts Corporation associate players